This is a list of films released in the 1990s produced in Armenia or directed by Armenians or about Armenia or Armenians, ordered by year of release.

References

External links
 Armenian film at the Internet Movie Database

See also
 List of Soviet films

1990
Lists of 1990s films
Films